Shahrak-e Shahid Motahhari (also Romanized as Shahrak-e Shahīd Moţahharī) is a village in Hasanabad Rural District, Hasanabad District, Eqlid County, Fars Province, Iran. At the 2006 census, its population was 236, in 48 families.

References 

Populated places in Eqlid County